The Puerto Rico statehood movement aims to make Puerto Rico a state of the United States. Puerto Rico is an unincorporated territorial possession of the United States acquired in 1898 following the Spanish–American War, making it "the oldest colony in the modern world". As of 2019, the population of Puerto Rico is 3.2 million, around half the average state population and higher than that of 20 U.S. states. Competing options for the future political status of Puerto Rico include maintaining its current status, becoming fully independent, or becoming a freely associated state. Puerto Rico has held six referendums on the topic. These are non-binding, as the power to grant statehood lies with the US Congress. The most recent referendum was in November 2020, with a majority (52.52%) of those who voted opting for statehood.

Although the previous two referendums (November 2012 and June 2017) also had ostensibly pro-statehood outcomes, The New York Times described them as "marred, with ballot language phrased to favor the party in office".
For example, the fourth referendum, held in November 2012, asked voters (1) whether they wanted to maintain the current political status of Puerto Rico and, if not, (2) which alternative status they prefer.
Of the fifty-four percent (54.0%) who voted "No" on maintaining the status quo, 61.11% chose statehood, 33.34% chose free association, and 5.55% chose independence. Opponents of statehood argued that these results did not show that a majority of Puerto Rican voters support statehood.
The June 2017 referendum was, according to the New York Times, a "flawed election" where the turnout was only 23%, in part because most statehood opponents sat out. 97% of votes cast favored statehood. The November 2020 referendum was the first to ask voters a simple yes-or-no question: "Should Puerto Rico be admitted immediately into the Union as a State?". There were 655,505 votes in favor of statehood (52.52%) and 592,671 votes opposed (47.48%). The 55% turnout rate equaled that for the simultaneous 2020 gubernatorial race and the 2016 gubernatorial race.

Background

Following the Spanish–American War, Puerto Rico was ceded to the United States in 1898, through the signing of the Treaty of Paris. Puerto Rico became an unincorporated, organized territory of the US through a series of judicial decisions by the Supreme Court of the United States, collectively known as "The Insular Cases" and the enactment of several statutes by Congress.

In 1900, the U.S. Congress enacted the Foraker Act, establishing a civil government in the territory and then in 1917, Puerto Ricans were granted US citizenship, by the enactment of the Jones-Shafroth Act. The Office of the President is responsible for policy relations between the United States and Puerto Rico, although according to the Territorial Clause of Constitution of the United States of America "The Congress shall have power to dispose of and make all needful Rules and Regulations respecting the Territory or other Property belonging to the United States...". In 1952, voters in Puerto Rico approved a new constitution proposed by Gov. Luis Munoz Marin; this led to the territory being designated as a commonwealth.

Potential benefits of statehood 

Puerto Rico is, by a considerable margin, the largest U.S. territory in terms of both population and geographical area, being similar to Connecticut with respect to population size (~3.3 million to CT's 3.6 million) and geographical area (13,791 square km to CT's 14,357). Puerto Rico residents do not participate in the Presidential elections because Puerto Rico does not have any electoral votes, but individual Puerto Ricans do have the right to vote when residing in a U.S. state or the District of Columbia. Statehood would allow the population to vote in all elections as the residents of states already can.

Other benefits to statehood include increased disability benefits and Medicaid funding as well as the higher (federal) minimum wage. Benefits of statehood include an additional $10 billion per year in federal funds, the right to vote in presidential elections, higher Social Security and Medicare benefits, and a right for its government agencies and municipalities to file for bankruptcy. The latter is currently prohibited.

The primary debate over Puerto Rican statehood is about representation. Some proposals seek to give it representation without statehood, giving it its apportioned representatives in the House and two Senators like a state without officially adding it to the union.

Whether Puerto Rico is given statehood or simply apportioned members of Congress as a Commonwealth or territory, this will have an impact on the make-up of the House. As the Reapportionment Act of 1929 mandates the House be capped at 435 members, Puerto Rico would end up with Representatives that would otherwise have been apportioned to other states. If only Puerto Rico was admitted, the following states would be projected to lose at least one seat: New York, Pennsylvania, Ohio, Illinois, Michigan.

History
Since the transfer of sovereignty of Puerto Rico from Spain to the United States, the relationship between Puerto Rico and the US has been debated by many. On April 11, 1899, the peace treaty between Spain and the USA (the 1898 Treaty of Paris) became effective, and established a military government in Puerto Rico. This was short lived, since the following year (April 2, 1900) Congress enacted the Foraker Act, which established a civil government and free trade between Puerto Rico and the USA. Puerto Ricans, although incapable of electing members of the territory's executive branch, were now able to elect their local representatives and a resident commissioner to the US Congress, who had a voice but no vote. In 1917, the enactment of the Jones-Shafroth Act the territory of Puerto Rico was organized and statutory US citizenship was granted to its residents.

Since 1967, there have been several referendums, which included questions on statehood. Puerto Ricans chose not to alter the status quo in referendums until 2012. The 2012 referendum produced a more equivocal result.

1967 referendum

A referendum on the status of the island was held in Puerto Rico on July 23, 1967. Voters were given the choice between being a Commonwealth, statehood or independence. The majority of voters voted for Commonwealth status, with a voter turnout of 65.9%.

1998 referendum

A referendum in December 1998 offered voters four political status options: statehood, independence, free association, and territorial commonwealth, plus "none of the above." The latter option won 50.5% of the vote, followed by statehood, with 46.6%. Turnout was 71%.

2012 referendum

On November 6, 2012, voters were presented with two questions:
(1) whether they agreed to continue with Puerto Rico's territorial status and (2) to indicate the political status they preferred from three possibilities: statehood, independence, or a sovereign nation in free association with the United States. Voters who chose "No" to the first question numbered 970,910 (54.0%), expressing themselves against continuing the current political status, while those who voted "Yes" numbered 828,077 (46.0%), indicating their desire to continue the current political status relationship. Of those who answered the second question, 834,191 (61.2%) chose statehood, 454,768 (33.3%) chose free association, and 74,895 (5.5%) chose independence. The preferred status consultation did not include Puerto Rico's current status as a territory (Estado Libre Asociado as defined by the 1952 Constitution) as a choice, but instead an alternative named "E.L.A. Soberano" On December 11, 2012, the Legislative Assembly of Puerto Rico enacted a concurrent resolution requesting the President and the Congress of the United States to respond diligently and effectively on the demand of the people of Puerto Rico to end its current political status and to begin the transition of Puerto Rico to become a state of the union. This was followed by a hearing at the Senate Energy and Natural Resources Committee on Puerto Rico's status on August 1, 2013, and (in 2014) resolutions introduced in both houses of the United States Congress (H.R. 2000; S. 2020) to hold a yes-or-no referendum among the residents of Puerto Rico on statehood. Both resolutions died in committee.

2017 referendum

Because there were almost 500,000 blank ballots in the 2012 referendum, creating confusion as to the voters' true desire, Congress ignored the results, but passed a budget bill which included $2.5M in funding for a future referendum, intended to help educate the population on any future plebiscite. The fifth referendum was held on June 11, 2017, and offered voters three options: "Statehood", "Free Association/Independence" and "Current Territorial Status". The turnout was only 23% because statehood opponents boycotted it, arguing that the ballot language was biased towards pro-statehood. Some would later try to attribute the boycott to the PPD party, citing its support for the status quo. Of the voters who participated, 97.18% chose statehood, 1.50% favored independence and 1.32% chose to maintain the commonwealth status.

Puerto Rico Statehood Admission Act

A bill (H.R. 4901) for Puerto Ricans to vote "yes" or "no" on statehood was introduced on October 29, 2019, by Puerto Rico Resident Commissioner Jenniffer González Colón, but died in Committee. A corresponding bill in the Legislative Assembly of Puerto Rico that would implement the vote, known in English as the Law for the Final Definition of the Political Status of Puerto Rico (P.S. 1467), was approved by both houses on March 31, 2020, and sent to the Governor for signature. The single question was "Should Puerto Rico be immediately admitted into the Union as a state?", with only two options: "yes" or "no".

2020 referendum

On May 16, 2020, Governor Wanda Vázquez Garced announced that a referendum on Puerto Rico's statehood would be held in November of that year. For the first time in the territory's history, only one direct question was asked: "Should Puerto Rico be admitted immediately into the Union as a State?" Previous referendums presented multiple options such as independence or maintaining the current territorial status. The announcement came amid growing disillusionment with Puerto Rico's territorial status due to the lack of access to federal funds for recent natural disasters, such as Hurricane Maria and the COVID-19 pandemic.

The referendum was held on November 3, 2020. There were 655,505 voted yes to statehood (52.52%) and 592,671 voted no to statehood (47.48%). After the results, the Puerto Rico Legislature, which at the time had a pro-statehood majority, passed the "Puerto Rico Congressional Act" calling a special election to elect two shadow senators and four shadow House-members to Washington D.C. to advocate for Statehood. In the US House of Representatives, a bill to provide for the admission of the State of Puerto Rico into the Union was introduced. These bills, H.R. 1522 and S. 780, were supported by 50 Puerto Rican pro-statehood organizations, who "[called] on the House Committee on Natural Resources and the Senate Committee on Energy and Natural Resources to approve that legislation."

Puerto Rico Status Act
On December 15, 2022, H.R. 8393 passed the House of Representatives in a 233–191 vote with 11 absences. It would have instituted a binding referendum that would allow Puerto Ricans to vote on the future status of the island, that Congress would have to obey. Every Democrat voted in favor of the bill, and was joined by 16 Republicans. The bill died in the Senate.

Support outside Puerto Rico
Support for statehood has been expressed by President George H. W. Bush, former Massachusetts Governor (now U.S. Senator) Mitt Romney, President Joe Biden, U.S. Representative Steny Hoyer, U.S. Representative Stephanie Murphy, former Florida Governor (now U.S. Senator) Rick Scott, U.S. Senator Marco Rubio, former Florida Governor Jeb Bush, U.S. Virgin Islands Governor Albert Bryan, and 
American Samoa Delegate to Congress Amata Coleman Radewagen.

Statehood supporters

The Taking of Congress was an event that started on January 15, 2013, in the United States Capitol in which more than 130 private citizens from different advocacy groups in Puerto Rico started a campaign in which they visited every member of the United States Congress in order to speak about the results of the 2012 Puerto Rican status referendumin which a majority of voters expressed themselves against the current political status of Puerto Rico. They also attempted to persuade the members of Congress to initiate a process to change Puerto Rico's political status. The campaign was supported by former U.S. representative José Enrique Serrano and former Resident Commissioner of Puerto Rico (now Governor) Pedro Pierluisi. Groups involved included Alianza Pro Libre Asociación Soberana (ALAS), Boricua Ahora Es, Igualdad Futuro Seguro, Renacer Ideológico Estadista (RIE), Proyecto Estrella, Young Democrats of America, and Young Republican Federation of Puerto Rico.

See also

Notes

References

Further reading

External links
 S.2020 – Puerto Rico Status Resolution Act of 2014

 
Political advocacy groups in Puerto Rico
Puerto Rico
Public policy proposals